Flight – The Passionate Affair was a Canadian documentary television miniseries which aired on CBC Television in 1976.

Premise
Canadian aviation history was featured in this four-part documentary series, written and narrated by Patrick Watson.

Scheduling
The hour-long episodes aired Sundays at 10:00 p.m. (Eastern) from 19 September to 10 October 1976. It was rebroadcast in May 1981. Subjects included the Avro Canada CF-105 Arrow, Billy Bishop, and the development of competing Canadian airlines such as Trans-Canada Air Lines and Canadian Pacific Air Lines.

References

External links
 
 Flight - The Passionate Affair at CBC Digital Archives
 

CBC Television original programming
Documentary television series about aviation
1976 Canadian television series debuts
1976 Canadian television series endings